The GF World Cup is an annual women's friendly handball tournament organised by the Danish Handball Federation and sponsored by insurance company GF Forsikring. Eight invited teams compete at the event, including permanent representatives Sweden and Denmark.

The first GF World Cup took place in November 2005 in NRGi Arena, Aarhus.

Russia is the most recent champion of the tournament and it is also the most successful team in the history of the cup with three titles.

Editions

Overall medal count

References

 
Handball competitions in Europe
Handball competitions in Denmark
Women's handball competitions
International handball competitions hosted by Denmark
Recurring sporting events established in 2005
2005 establishments in Denmark